The Eagle Shooting Heroes (Chinese: 射鵰英雄傳之東成西就) is a 1993 Hong Kong comedy film directed by Jeffrey Lau. It is a parody of Louis Cha's novel The Legend of the Condor Heroes, and a classic example of the mo lei tau comedy.

Production
The film was said to be caused by the over-budgeting of Wong Kar-wai's Ashes of Time. In order to cover up the cost of the yet unfinished film, the director decided to use the whole cast to shoot a "quick-and-dirty" film for show during the Chinese New Year, a period for Hong Kong film industry to harvest cash.

Cast
 Leslie Cheung as Huang Yaoshi
 Tony Leung Ka-fai as Duan Zhixing
 Tony Leung Chiu-wai as Ouyang Feng
 Jacky Cheung as Hong Qigong
 Kenny Bee as Wang Chongyang
 Brigitte Lin as Third Princess
 Joey Wong as Suqiu, Huang Yaoshi's lover
 Maggie Cheung as Imperial Master
 Carina Lau as Zhou Botong
 Veronica Yip as Ouyang Feng's cousin
 Szema Wah Lung as Persian King
 Paw Hee-ching as one of Third Princess' guards

Music
In addition to a score by James Wong and Mark Lui, the film contains a song set to the overture from Gioacchino Rossini's Guillaume Tell, as well as uncredited excerpts from "L'amour est un oiseau rebelle" from Georges Bizet's Carmen and Danse des petits cygnes from Piotr Ilyich Tchaikovsky's Swan Lake.

References

External links
 
 

1993 films
1993 martial arts films
Hong Kong action comedy films
Hong Kong slapstick comedy films
Hong Kong martial arts comedy films
Films based on works by Jin Yong
1990s Cantonese-language films
Wuxia films
Works based on The Legend of the Condor Heroes
Films directed by Jeffrey Lau
Films set in 12th-century Song dynasty
1990s parody films
1993 action comedy films
Chinese New Year films
1990s Hong Kong films